Walther Eichrodt (August 1, 1890 in Gernsbach, Baden – May 20, 1978 in Basel) was a German Old Testament scholar and Protestant theologian.

From 1908 to 1914 he studied theology in Bethel, Greifswald and Heidelberg, obtaining his habilitation at the University of Erlangen in 1918. In 1922 he succeeded Albrecht Alt as an associate professor of history of religions and Old Testament studies at the University of Basel,  where from 1934 to 1960 he taught classes as a full professor. In 1953 he was named university rector.

Eichrodt believed that the book of Genesis was added as a prologue to the Old Testament after the writing of Exodus had been completed.

Literary works 
 Die Quellen der Genesis (1916).
 Die Hoffnung des ewigen Friedens alten Israel (1920).
 Theologie des Alten Testaments, 3 volumes (1933–39); translated into English and published in 2 volumes as Theology of the Old Testament (1961, 1967).
 Das Menschenverständnis des Alten Testaments (1944); translated into English and published as Man in the Old Testament (1951).
 Ezekiel; a commentary; English translation by Cosslett Quin (1970).

References

External links
 

German biblical scholars
20th-century German Protestant theologians
1890 births
1978 deaths
People from Gernsbach
Old Testament scholars
Academic staff of the University of Basel
German male non-fiction writers